The Garcha Hotels is a luxury hotel group founded in 2015  by Harpreet Bedi and Satinder Garcha, two Indian entrepreneurs.  The group consists of a chain of boutique hotels, many of which are located in Singapore.

History
The Garcha Hotel's group has operated since 2015 and was created by Harpreet Bedi and Satinder Garcha,
two former Silicon Valley entrepreneurs. Bedi is an intellectual property lawyer while Garcha is the founder of  People.com Consulting Inc. Both turned to property and hospitality.  Garcha, one of Singapore's most richest businessmen and a polo patron,  has invested $250 million in the past few years buying heritage properties and converting them into hotels in Singapore and plans for Santiago (old City Hotel), as 'Garcha Hotels'  in 2020.
In October 2012, Garcha purchased for 75 million dollars the Murray Terrace, a row of 14 pre-war shophouses in Singapore. Then, he created the Six Senses Maxwell out of a building dating back to 1929 and restored in 2009. It was previously operated as an office building mainly by the advertising agency Leo Burnett.

Description
The Garcha Hotels group includes Six Senses Hotels Resorts Spas  and The Vagabond Club, a Tribute Portfolio Hotel in Singapore.

The Six Senses Hotels Resorts Spas is Singapore's oldest boutique hotel including The Six Senses Duxton (May 2018) and Six Senses Maxwell (third quarter of 2018). Six Senses Hotels was built by converting a row of 100 years-old shop houses occupied by Strait Chinese traders and their families. In 1996, it became the oldest hotel in Southeast Asia to become member of the Relais & Châteaux association, an international fellowship of private luxury hotels and restaurants.

The Vagabond Club, converted from a 1950 building, is the group's first hotel to open its doors in November 2015. It is owned and operated by Harpreet Bedi,  housed in a vintage art deco building with interiors created by Jacques Garcia,  a French interior and garden designer who is best known for his contemporary interiors of Paris hotels and restaurants including Hôtel Costes. The Vagabond Club is Singapore's first carbon-free hotel after purchasing carbon credits and the only hotel with an Artist in Residence programme to support local and international artists. The Vagabond and the Duxton Club are part of The Luxury Collection and Tribute Portfolio brands.

The Duxton Club including  the Duxton House and the Duxton Terrace, opened in September 2018 near Singapore's Chinatown and the central business district of Tanjong Pagar. The hotel is housed in two prewar colonial heritage buildings with decorations by designer Anouska Hempel. Architect and designer Jacques Garcia oversaw the transformation of the Duxton Terrace.

References

External links
 Garcha Hotels website

Hotel buildings completed in 2015
Hotels in Singapore
Hotel and leisure companies based in Singapore
Art Deco architecture
Hotels established in 2015
2015 establishments in Singapore